Guts or  Lef  is a 1999 Dutch comedy film directed by Ron Termaat.

Cast
Viggo Waas	... 	Olivier / Jules
Alice Reys	... 	Marielle
Rick Engelkes	... 	Luc
Victor Reinier	... 	Ex-vriend / Clerence
Berco van Rheeden	... 	Bob
Michiel Varga	... 	Regisseur
Isolde Hallensleben	... 	Regie-assistante
Eric van Sauers	... 	Aanplakker
Ineke Veenhoven	... 	Tante Liesbeth
Lia Bolte	... 	Productieleidster
Bert Verboom	... 	Cameraman
Fer van Duren	... 	Art-director
Evert van der Meulen	... 	Autokoper
Ron Termaat	... 	Ober

External links 
 

Dutch comedy films
1999 films
1990s Dutch-language films
1999 comedy films